The Third Federal Electoral District of Chiapas (III Distrito Electoral Federal de Chiapas) is one of the 300 Electoral Districts into which Mexico is divided for the purpose of elections to the federal Chamber of Deputies and one of 12 such districts in the state of Chiapas.

It elects one deputy to the lower house of Congress for each three-year legislative period, by means of the first past the post system.

District territory
The Third District of Chiapas is located in the extreme east of the state and covers much of the Lacandon Jungle.
It comprises the municipalities of Altamirano, Benemérito de las Américas, Chanal, Las Margaritas, Maravilla Tenejapa, Marqués de Comillas, Ocosingo and Oxchuc.

The district's head town (cabecera distrital), where results from individual polling stations are gathered together and collated, is the city of Ocosingo.

Previous districting schemes

1996–2005 district
Between 1996 and 2005, the Third District was broadly the same as under the current scheme, with the following differences:
Chanal was a part of the  Eighth District.
The Third District also included San Juan Cancuc and Sitalá.
Benemérito de las Américas, Maravilla Tenejapa and Marqués de Comillas had not yet been given municipal status; however, they belonged to the municipality of Ocosingo and so were included in the district by that token.

Deputies returned to Congress from this district

L Legislature
 1976–1979: Homero Tovilla Cristiani (PRI)
LI Legislature
 1979–1982: Leyver Martínez González (PRI)
LII Legislature
 1982–1985: Homero Tovilla Cristiani (PRI)
LIII Legislature
 1985–1988:
LIV Legislature
 1988–1991: José Javier Culebro Siles (PRI)
LV Legislature
 1991–1994:
LVI Legislature
 1994–1997: Alí Cancino Herrera (PRI)
LVII Legislature
 1997–2000: Norberto Sántiz López (PRI)
LVIII Legislature
 2000–2003: Santiago López Hernández (PRI)
LIX Legislature
 2003–2006: Juan Antonio Gordillo (PRI)
LX Legislature
 2006–2009: Elmar Díaz Solórzano (PRI)

References 

Federal electoral districts of Mexico
Government of Chiapas